Aberdeen is a city in Bingham County, Idaho, United States. The community was named after Aberdeen, in Scotland. The population was 1,994 at the 2010 census, up from 1,840 in 2000.

Geography

Climate
Aberdeen has a semi-arid steppe climate (BSk) according to the Köppen climate classification system.

Demographics

2010 census
As of the census of 2010, there were 1,994 people, 615 households, and 466 families residing in the city. The racial makeup of the city was 60.2% White, 0.1% African American, 0.7% Native American, 0.1% Asian, 37.5% from other races, and 1.5% from two or more races. Hispanic or Latino of any race were 54.1% of the population.

There were 615 households, of which 49.6% had children under the age of 18 living with them, 59.0% were married couples living together, 10.6% had a female householder with no husband present, 6.2% had a male householder with no wife present, and 24.2% were non-families. 20.0% of all households were made up of individuals, and 10.7% had someone living alone who was 65 years of age or older. The average household size was 3.24 and the average family size was 3.79.

The median age in the city was 28.1 years. 37.2% of residents were under the age of 18; 8.7% were between the ages of 18 and 24; 24.2% were from 25 to 44; 19.8% were from 45 to 64; and 10.1% were 65 years of age or older. The gender makeup of the city was 50.6% male and 49.4% female.

2000 census
As of the census of 2000, there were 1,840 people, 603 households, and 435 families residing in the city. The racial makeup of the city was 66.30% White, 0.11% African American, 0.71% Native American, 0.33% Asian, 0.05% Pacific Islander, 28.91% from other races, and 3.59% from two or more races. Hispanic or Latino of any race were 39.29% of the population.

There were 603 households, out of which 41.0% had children under the age of 18 living with them, 60.7% were married couples living together, 7.5% had a female householder with no husband present, and 27.7% were non-families. 26.7% of all households were made up of individuals, and 14.6% had someone living alone who was 65 years of age or older.  The average household size was 3.05 and the average family size was 3.75.

In the city, the population was spread out, with 38.3% under the age of 18, 7.2% from 18 to 24, 25.4% from 25 to 44, 17.1% from 45 to 64, and 12.0% who were 65 years of age or older.  The median age was 29 years. For every 100 females, there were 95.7 males.  For every 100 females age 18 and over, there were 96.2 males.

The median income for a household in the city was $28,625, and the median income for a family was $31,393. Males had a median income of $27,537 versus $19,531 for females. The per capita income for the city was $10,907.  About 14.9% of families and 20.5% of the population were below the poverty line, including 27.0% of those under age 18 and 14.2% of those age 65 or over.

Education
Aberdeen Public Schools are part of the Aberdeen School District #58. Schools located in the district include Aberdeen Elementary School, Aberdeen Middle School and Aberdeen High School.

The University of Idaho's Aberdeen Research and Extension Center is located near the town.

C.J. Ward is the Superintendent of Schools.

Transportation

Airport
Aberdeen Municipal Airport is a city-owned public-use airport located two nautical miles (3.7 km) southwest of the central business district of Aberdeen.

Pocatello Regional Transit operates a shuttle bus from Aberdeen to Pocatello three times on Weekdays, and twice on Saturdays and Sundays.

References

External links
  - City of Aberdeen
 The Aberdeen Times - local newspaper

Cities in Bingham County, Idaho
Cities in Idaho